Șoseaua Kiseleff (Kiseleff Road) is a major road in Bucharest, Romania. Situated in Sector 1, the boulevard runs as a northward continuation of Calea Victoriei.

History
The road was created in 1832 by Pavel Kiselyov, the commander of the Russian occupation troops in Wallachia and Moldavia. The name was converted from Kiselyov to Kiseleff, using the French transliteration of Russian names at the time.

The area was not affected by the Ceaușima systematization plans and demolitions of Nicolae Ceaușescu, and has many pre-World War II residences.

Features
Victory Square (Piața Victoriei) and Free Press Square (Piața Presei Libere) stand at its two extreme points. The street has numerous museums, parks (Kiseleff Park and Herăstrău Park), grand residences, and the Arcul de Triumf along it between those end points.

Notable buildings

Notable buildings on Șoseaua Kiseleff include:
The Museum of the Romanian Peasant
The Geology Museum
The Grigore Antipa National Museum of Natural History
The Village Museum
The Elisabeta Palace, residence of Crown Princess Margareta
The , currently the headquarters of ING Bank Romania
The ; designed by architect Ion Mincu in 1892, it now houses the Casa Doina Restaurant.
The headquarters of the Social Democratic Party.

Also along Șoseaua Kiseleff one finds the embassies of Belarus, 
Canada, Peru, and Russia, as well as the residence of the Ambassador of the United States to Romania.

Reference

External links

Streets in Bucharest